Bruno Roland Grip (born 1 January 1941) is a Swedish former footballer.

Grip played as a defender in AIK and made his debut in Allsvenskan 1964, and played there until he changed club to IK Sirius in 1971. He played there until his retirement in 1975.

He was capped 55 times for the Swedish national team and played in the 1970 FIFA World Cup and the 1974 FIFA World Cup.

References

External links

Profile at AIK

1941 births
Living people
Swedish footballers
Sweden international footballers
1970 FIFA World Cup players
1974 FIFA World Cup players
Allsvenskan players
IFK Östersund players
AIK Fotboll players
Swedish football managers
IK Sirius Fotboll players
Association football defenders